Saxifraga hirculus is a species of saxifrage, commonly called marsh saxifrage, yellow marsh saxifrage, or bog saxifrage. It is a perennial herb with yellow flowers and red stem, 5–30 cm high, found on bog landscape.

Saxifraga hirculus is a known food source for the generalist fungus species Mycosphaerella tassiana and the pathogenic fungus species Melampsora hirculi.

References

External links
Photo gallery

hirculus
Plants described in 1753
Taxa named by Carl Linnaeus